Arcuella is a genus of medium-sized sea snails, marine gastropod mollusks in the family Eulimidae.

Species

There is currently only one known species within this genus of gastropods:

 Arcuella mirifica (G. Nevill & H. Nevill, 1874)

References

 Warén A. (1984) A generic revision of the family Eulimidae (Gastropoda, Prosobranchia). Journal of Molluscan Studies suppl. 13: 1-96.

External links
 To World Register of Marine Species

Eulimidae